RNA component of mitochondrial RNA processing endoribonuclease, also known as RMRP, is a human gene.

Mitochondrial RNA-processing endoribonuclease cleaves mitochondrial RNA complementary to the light chain of the displacement loop at a unique site (Chang and Clayton, 1987). The enzyme is a ribonucleoprotein whose RNA component is a nuclear gene product. The RNA component is the first RNA encoded by a single-copy gene in the nucleus and imported into mitochondria. The RMRP gene is untranslated, i.e., it encodes an RNA not a protein.[supplied by OMIM]

It is associated with cartilage–hair hypoplasia.

References

Further reading

External links 
 
  GeneReviews/NCBI/NIH/UW entry on Cartilage-Hair Hypoplasia - Anauxetic Dysplasia Spectrum Disorders

RNA
Proteins